The Libertarian National Committee (LNC) controls and manages the affairs, properties, and funds of the United States Libertarian Party.  It is composed of the party officers, five at-large representatives elected every two years at the national convention, and a theoretical maximum of 10 regional representatives. The current chair is Angela McArdle, elected at the 2022 Libertarian National Convention.

The LNC has lobbied or filed lawsuits against laws and regulations that restrict contributions to parties and candidates.

Current members

At-large members

Regional representatives

List of LNC chairs

Subcommittees

See also 
 Democratic National Committee
 Green National Committee
 Republican National Committee
 List of state parties of the Libertarian Party (United States)

References

External links 
 Official Website
 Members of the Libertarian National Committee
 Libertarian Party Bylaws and Convention Rules (PDF) adopted in Convention, July 2018, New Orleans, Louisiana

Libertarian Party (United States)
Libertarian Party (United States) organizations
Executive committees of political parties
Organizations based in Alexandria, Virginia